(), also known as , is typically a form of abbreviated or short , similar to an overskirt, in . It was typically worn by Han Chinese women over their long-length , traditional Chinese skirts. It was typically worn along with the  consisting of a short , which reaches the waist-level, and a long-length . Throughout centuries, the  has often depicted in Chinese paintings,  unearthed artifacts and in Chinese tomb mural paintings.

Similar items 

 
 Overskirt

See also 

 Hanfu
 List of Hanfu

Gallery

Notes

References 

Hanfu
Chinese traditional clothing
Skirts